The 2023 Pac-12 Conference women's basketball tournament, presented by New York Life, was a postseason tournament held from March 1–5, 2023, at Michelob Ultra Arena on the Las Vegas Strip in Paradise, Nevada. 

Washington State, seeded seventh out of the conference's 12 teams, won the tournament and with it the Pac-12 Conference's automatic bid to the NCAA Division I women's tournament. ESPN journalist Alexa Philippou called Washington State's title run "one of the more improbable Power 5 conference tournament runs in recent memory." The championship game was the first in the tournament's history not to feature any of the top four seeds, and the Cougars were the lowest seed ever to reach the title game, much less win it. This was the first Pac-12 title for Washington State in any women's sport, and the first Pac-12 tournament championship in any sport for the Cougars since 2002.

Seeds

Schedule

Bracket

Note: * denotes overtime

Pac-12 All-Tournament team
 MVP: Charlisse Leger-Walker, Washington State
 Bella Murekatete, Washington State
 Cameron Brink, Stanford
 Emily Bessoir (11 pts, 5 reb, 3 ast), UCLA
 Charisma Osborne (19 pts, 6-7 FT, 3 ast), UCLA
 Kiki Rice (13 pts, 3 reb), UCLA

Hall of Honor 
The 2023 class of the Pac-12 Hall of Honor was honored on March 3 during the 2023 Women's Tournament during a ceremony prior to the tournament semifinals.  The 2023 class was the first ever all-female class inducted into the Hall of Honor in recognition of the 50th anniversary of the passage of Title IX.  The class includes: 

 Susie Parra (Arizona Softball)
 Jackie Johnson-Powell (Arizona State Women's Track & Field)
 Dr. Luella Lilly (California Athletic Director)
 Ceal Barry (Colorado Women's Basketball Coach & Administrator)
 Janie Takeda Reed (Oregon Softball)
  Dr. Mary Budke (Oregon State Women's Golf)
 Jessica Mendoza (Stanford Softball)
 Natalie Williams (UCLA Women's Basketball & Volleyball)
 Barbara Hallquist DeGroot (USC Women's Tennis)
 Kim Gaucher (Utah Women's Basketball)
 Danielle Lawrie (Washington Softball)
 Sarah Silvernail (Washington State Women's Volleyball)

See also
 2023 Pac-12 Conference men's basketball tournament

References

External links
Official website – Pac-12 Conference women's basketball tournament

Tournament
Pac-12 Conference women's basketball tournament
Pac-12
Basketball competitions in the Las Vegas Valley
2023 in sports in Nevada
March 2023 sports events in the United States
Women's sports in Nevada
College sports tournaments in Nevada